Rnd2 is a small (~21 kDa) signaling G protein (to be specific, a GTPase), and is a member of the Rnd subgroup of the Rho family of GTPases. It is encoded by the gene RND2.

Function 

It contributes to regulating the organization of the actin cytoskeleton in response to extracellular growth factors (Nobes et al., 1998).[supplied by OMIM]

This particular family member has been implicated in the regulation of neuronal morphology and endosomal trafficking.

Clinical significance 

The gene localizes to chromosome 17 and is the centromeric neighbor of the breast-ovarian cancer susceptibility gene BRCA1.

Interactions 

Rnd2 has been shown to interact with:
 ARHGAP5, 
 RACGAP1,  and
 UBXD5.

References

Further reading